Old Brick Church may refer to:

 Old Brick Church (Iowa City, Iowa)
 Old Brick Church (Fairfield County, South Carolina)
 Old Brick Church (New York City)
 Old Brick Church (Athens, Vermont)
 Old Brick Church (Bacon's Castle, Virginia)

See also
Brick Church (disambiguation)